TSBP1 is a protein that in humans is encoded by the TSBP1 gene. C6orf10 is an open reading frame on chromosome 6 containing a protein that is ubiquitously expressed at low levels in the adult genome and may play a role during fetal development. C6orf10 has been found to be linked to both neurodegenerative and autoimmune diseases in adults. Expression of this gene is highest in the testis but is also seen in other tissue types such as the brain, lens of the eye and the medulla. TSBP1 was previously known as C6orf10.

mRNA Transcript 

C6orf10 contains seven human mRNA splice variants (a, b, c, X1, X2, X3, X4).

Conserved non-coding region 
TSBP1 contains a highly conserved stem loop structure in the 3' UTR from bases 100–124.

Protein

Composition 
C6orf10 isoform a is rich in lysine (K), Glutamine (Q) and Glutamic acid (E) and poor in Histidine (H) and Phenylalanine(F)]. Isoform a is a basic protein with an isoelectric point of 9 and a molecular weight of 62,000 kDa.

This isoform contains two transmembrane regions near the beginning of the amino acid sequence. The first transmembrane region spans from residue 6 to residue 25 (19 total residues) and has an isoelectric point of 5. The second transmembrane region spans from residue 100 to residue 119 (19 total residues) and has an isoelectric point of 8. Isoform a contains a PTZ00121 domain starting with residue 221 and going until the end of the protein. There are several repetitive sequences within this domain.

Secondary Structure 

TSBP1 consists mostly of alpha helices and random coils. There are only a few regions that contain beta sheets.

Subcellular Localization 
TSBP1 is predicted to be localized to the Nucleus and the Endoplasmic Reticulum. There is a signal peptide cleavage site between amino acid 30 and 31 which includes the first transmembrane domain. This N-terminal region of C6orf10 is likely localized to the endoplasmic reticulum. The C-terminal region of the protein contain two nuclear localization signals from amino acid 489-505 and 513-529 indicating that the section of the protein after the signal peptide cleavage site is localized to the nucleus.

Expression 
TSBP1 is ubiquitously expressed at low levels in the adult human genome. In adults, expression of this gene is highest in the testis. C6orf10 is expressed at higher levels in fetal and embryonic tissues. This indicates C6orf10 may play a role in development.

Regulation of expression

Transcriptional 
TSBP1 has a promoter that is 1206 bases long. This promoter overlaps with the 3' UTR but ends before the first codon. This promoter is fairly well conserved across primates except for a 136 nucleotide region midway through and the end of the promoter region. Primates have insertions at these two regions that humans are missing. This may suggest that these regions of the promoter are not essential to humans.

Transcription factors 
TSBP1 transcription is regulated by the binding of many transcription factors to the promoter region. The CCAAT binding protein and TATA box are highly conserved regions that are important in the initiation of transcription. Several of the transcription factors including EH1, NACA, NKX5-2, SIX4, VCR, etc. are involved in developmental pathways.

Protein Interactions 
Most of the predicted protein interactions with C6orf10 are based solely on text mining and information gathered from genome-wide association studies. The two proteins with the highest interaction scores were Butyrophilin-like protein 2 (BTNL2) and Tetratricopeptide repeat domain containing TTC32. BTNL2 is a negative regulator of T-cell activity and member of the immunoglobulin superfamily. BTNL2 is located in the C6orf10 gene neighborhood. TTC32 is from a protein family of structural repeat motifs that mediate protein-protein interactions in the formation of protein-protein complexes. This may indicate the potential for C6orf10 to interact with another protein for form a complex.

Clinical significance 
C6orf10 has been found to be associated with both neurodegenerative diseases and autoimmune diseases. These associations are mostly obtained from genome wide association studies. Common neurodegenerative diseases associated with C6orf10 include frontotemporal dementia, Parkinson's disease, and Alzheimer's disease. Autoimmune diseases associated with C6orf10 include Rheumatoid arthritis, psoriasis, multiple sclerosis, Grave's disease and lupus.

Homologs

Orthologs
By searching the NCBI BLAST database for protein-protein interactions, it was found that C6orf10 is a protein only found in mammals. The BLAST database found the highest number of homologs in the Primates, Artiodactyla, and Carnivora. There were only a couple of homologs in the taxonomic orders of Rodentia, Chiroptera, and Perissodactyla. In the orders of Scandentia, Eulipotyphyla, Tubulidentata and sirenia there was only one complete homolog, but a few partial sequences do exist. There were partial protein sequences in Lagomorpha, Dermoptera, and Macroscelidea and there were no orthologs in Diprotodontia, Didelphimorphia, Cetacea, Dasyuromorphia, Pilosa, Monotremata, and Proboscidea. No homologs were found outside of mammals.

C6orf10 Isoform X4 Orthologs

Paralogs 
C6orf10 has one paralog that diverged about 135.6 million years ago. This paralog is called Thioredoxin domain containing protein 2 (TXNDC2).
[1] BLAST: Basic Local Alignment Search Tool. National Center for Biotechnology InformationAvailable at: https://blast.ncbi.nlm.nih.gov/Blast.cgi. Accessdate 4 March 2019.

References

External links

Further reading